Amateur radio, also known as ham radio, is the use of the radio frequency spectrum for purposes of non-commercial exchange of messages, wireless experimentation, self-training, private recreation, radiosport, contesting, and emergency communications. The term "amateur" is used to specify "a duly authorized person interested in radioelectric practice with a purely personal aim and without pecuniary interest;" (either direct monetary or other similar reward) and to differentiate it from commercial broadcasting, public safety (such as police and fire), or professional two-way radio services (such as maritime, aviation, taxis, etc.).

The amateur radio service (amateur service and amateur-satellite service) is established by the International Telecommunication Union (ITU) through the Radio Regulations. National governments regulate technical and operational characteristics of transmissions and issue individual station licenses with a unique identifying call sign, which must be used in all transmissions.  Amateur operators must hold an amateur radio license which is obtained by passing a government test demonstrating adequate technical radio knowledge and legal knowledge of the host government's radio regulations.

Radio amateurs are limited to a small set of frequency bands, the amateur radio bands, allocated throughout the radio spectrum, but within these bands are allowed to transmit on any frequency using a variety of voice, text, image, and data communications modes.  This enables communication across a city, region, country, continent, the world, or even into space. In many countries, amateur radio operators may also send, receive, or relay radio communications between computers or transceivers connected to secure virtual private networks on the Internet.

Amateur radio is officially represented and coordinated by the International Amateur Radio Union (IARU), which is organized in three regions and has as its members the national amateur radio societies which exist in most countries. According to an estimate made in 2011 by the American Radio Relay League, two million people throughout the world are regularly involved with amateur radio. About 830,000 amateur radio stations are located in IARU Region 2 (the Americas) followed by IARU Region 3 (South and East Asia and the Pacific Ocean) with about 750,000 stations. A significantly smaller number, about 400,000, are located in IARU Region 1 (Europe, Middle East, CIS, Africa).

History

The origins of amateur radio can be traced to the late 19th century, but amateur radio as practiced today began in the early 20th century. The First Annual Official Wireless Blue Book of the Wireless Association of America, produced in 1909, contains a list of amateur radio stations. This radio callbook lists wireless telegraph stations in Canada and the United States, including 89 amateur radio stations. As with radio in general, amateur radio was associated with various amateur experimenters and hobbyists. Amateur radio enthusiasts have significantly contributed to science, engineering, industry, and social services. Research by amateur operators has founded new industries, built economies, empowered nations, and saved lives in times of emergency. Ham radio can also be used in the classroom to teach English, map skills, geography, math, science, and computer skills.

Ham radio

The term "ham" was first a pejorative term used in professional wired telegraphy during the 19th century, to mock operators with poor Morse code-sending skills ("ham-fisted"). This term continued to be used after the invention of radio and the proliferation of amateur experimentation with wireless telegraphy; among land- and sea-based professional radio operators, "ham" amateurs were considered a nuisance. The use of "ham" meaning "amateurish or unskilled" survives today sparsely in other disciplines (e.g. "ham actor").

The amateur radio community subsequently began to reclaim the word as a label of pride, and by the mid-20th century it had lost its pejorative meaning. Although not an acronym, it is often mistakenly written as a backronym, with "HAM" in capital letters.

Activity and practice

The many facets of amateur radio attract practitioners with a wide range of interests. Many amateurs begin with a fascination with radio communication and then combine other personal interests to make pursuit of the hobby rewarding. Some of the focal areas amateurs pursue include radio contesting, radio propagation study, public service communication, technical experimentation, and computer networking.

Amateur radio operators use various modes of transmission to communicate. The two most common modes for voice transmissions are frequency modulation (FM) and single sideband (SSB). FM offers high quality audio signals, while SSB is better at long-distance communication when bandwidth is restricted.

Radiotelegraphy using Morse code, also known as "CW" from "continuous wave", is the wireless extension of landline (wired) telegraphy developed by Samuel Morse and dates to the earliest days of radio. Although computer-based (digital) modes and methods have largely replaced CW for commercial and military applications, many amateur radio operators still enjoy using the CW mode—particularly on the shortwave bands and for experimental work, such as Earth–Moon–Earth communication, because of its inherent signal-to-noise ratio advantages. Morse, using internationally agreed message encodings such as the Q code, enables communication between amateurs who speak different languages. It is also popular with homebrewers and in particular with "QRP" or very-low-power enthusiasts, as CW-only transmitters are simpler to construct, and the human ear-brain signal processing system can pull weak CW signals out of the noise where voice signals would be totally inaudible. A similar "legacy" mode popular with home constructors is amplitude modulation (AM), pursued by many vintage amateur radio enthusiasts and aficionados of vacuum tube technology.

Demonstrating a proficiency in Morse code was for many years a requirement to obtain an amateur license to transmit on frequencies below 30 MHz. Following changes in international regulations in 2003, countries are no longer required to demand proficiency. The United States Federal Communications Commission, for example, phased out this requirement for all license classes on 23 February 2007.

Modern personal computers have encouraged the use of digital modes such as radioteletype (RTTY) which previously required cumbersome mechanical equipment. Hams led the development of packet radio in the 1970s, which has employed protocols such as AX.25 and TCP/IP. Specialized digital modes such as PSK31 allow real-time, low-power communications on the shortwave bands but has been losing favor in place of newer digital modes such as FT8.

Radio over IP, or RoIP, is similar to Voice over IP (VoIP), but augments two-way radio communications rather than telephone calls. EchoLink using VoIP technology has enabled amateurs to communicate through local Internet-connected repeaters and radio nodes, while IRLP has allowed the linking of repeaters to provide greater coverage area.

Automatic link establishment (ALE) has enabled continuous amateur radio networks to operate on the high frequency bands with global coverage. Other modes, such as FSK441 using software such as WSJT, are used for weak signal modes including meteor scatter and moonbounce communications.

Fast scan amateur television has gained popularity as hobbyists adapt inexpensive consumer video electronics like camcorders and video cards in PCs. Because of the wide bandwidth and stable signals required, amateur television is typically found in the 70 cm (420–450 MHz) wavelength range, though there is also limited use on 33 cm (902–928 MHz), 23 cm (1240–1300 MHz) and shorter. These requirements also effectively limit the signal range to between 20 and 60 miles (30–100 km).

Linked repeater systems, however, can allow transmissions of VHF and higher frequencies across hundreds of miles. Repeaters are usually located on heights of land or tall structures and allow operators to communicate over hundreds of miles using hand-held or mobile transceivers. Repeaters can also be linked together by using other amateur radio bands, landline, or the Internet.

Amateur radio satellites can be accessed, some using a hand-held transceiver (HT), even, at times, using the factory "rubber duck" antenna. Hams also use the moon, the aurora borealis, and the ionized trails of meteors as reflectors of radio waves. Hams can also contact the International Space Station (ISS) because many astronauts are licensed as amateur radio operators.

Amateur radio operators use their amateur radio station to make contacts with individual hams as well as participating in round table discussion groups or "rag chew sessions" on the air. Some join in regularly scheduled on-air meetings with other amateur radio operators, called "nets" (as in "networks"), which are moderated by a station referred to as "Net Control". Nets can allow operators to learn procedures for emergencies, be an informal round table, or cover specific interests shared by a group.

Amateur radio operators, using battery- or generator-powered equipment, often provide essential communications services when regular channels are unavailable due to natural disaster or other disruptive events .

Many amateur radio operators participate in radio contests, during which an individual or team of operators typically seek to contact and exchange information with as many other amateur radio stations as possible in a given period of time. In addition to contests, a number of Amateur radio operating award schemes exist, sometimes suffixed with "on the Air", such as Summits on the Air, Islands on the Air, Worked All States and Jamboree on the Air.

Amateur radio operators may also act as citizen scientists for propagation research and atmospheric science.

Licensing

Radio transmission permits are closely controlled by nations' governments because radio waves propagate beyond national boundaries, and therefore radio is of international concern.

Both the requirements for and privileges granted to a licensee vary from country to country, but generally follow the international regulations and standards established by the International Telecommunication Union and World Radio Conferences.

All countries that license citizens to use amateur radio require operators to display knowledge and understanding of key concepts, usually by passing an exam. The licenses grant hams the privilege to operate in larger segments of the radio frequency spectrum, with a wider variety of communication techniques, and with higher power levels relative to unlicensed personal radio services (such as CB radio, FRS, and PMR446), which require type-approved equipment restricted in mode, range, and power.

Amateur licensing is a routine civil administrative matter in many countries. Amateurs therein must pass an examination to demonstrate technical knowledge, operating competence, and awareness of legal and regulatory requirements, in order to avoid interfering with other amateurs and other radio services. A series of exams are often available, each progressively more challenging and granting more privileges: greater frequency availability, higher power output, permitted experimentation, and, in some countries, distinctive call signs. Some countries, such as the United Kingdom and Australia, have begun requiring a practical assessment in addition to the written exams in order to obtain a beginner's license, which they call a Foundation License.

In most countries, an operator will be assigned a call sign with their license. In some countries, a separate "station license" is required for any station used by an amateur radio operator. Amateur radio licenses may also be granted to organizations or clubs. In some countries, hams were allowed to operate only club stations.

An amateur radio license is valid only in the country in which it is issued or in another country that has a reciprocal licensing agreement with the issuing country. Some countries, such as Syria and Cuba, restrict operation by foreigners to club stations only.

In some countries, an amateur radio license is necessary in order to purchase or possess amateur radio equipment.

Amateur radio licensing in the United States exemplifies the way in which some countries award different levels of amateur radio licenses based on technical knowledge: three sequential levels of licensing exams (Technician Class, General Class, and Amateur Extra Class) are currently offered, which allow operators who pass them access to larger portions of the Amateur Radio spectrum and more desirable (shorter) call signs. An exam, authorized by the Federal Communications Commission (FCC), is required for all levels of the Amateur Radio license. These exams are administered by Volunteer Examiners, accredited by the FCC-recognized Volunteer Examiner Coordinator (VEC) system. The Technician Class and General Class exams consist of 35 multiple-choice questions, drawn randomly from a pool of at least 350. To pass, 26 of the 35 questions must be answered correctly. The Extra Class exam has 50 multiple choice questions (drawn randomly from a pool of at least 500), 37 of which must be answered correctly. The tests cover regulations, customs, and technical knowledge, such as FCC provisions, operating practices, advanced electronics theory, radio equipment design, and safety. Morse Code is no longer tested in the U.S. Once the exam is passed, the FCC issues an Amateur Radio license which is valid for ten years. Studying for the exam is made easier because the entire question pools for all license classes are posted in advance. The question pools are updated every four years by the National Conference of VECs.

Licensing requirements
Prospective amateur radio operators are examined on understanding of the key concepts of electronics, radio equipment, antennas, radio propagation, RF safety, and the radio regulations of the government granting the license. These examinations are sets of questions typically posed in either a short answer or multiple-choice format. Examinations can be administered by bureaucrats, non-paid certified examiners, or previously licensed amateur radio operators.

The ease with which an individual can acquire an amateur radio license varies from country to country. In some countries, examinations may be offered only once or twice a year in the national capital and can be inordinately bureaucratic (for example in India) or challenging because some amateurs must undergo difficult security approval (as in Iran). Currently only Yemen and North Korea do not issue amateur radio licenses to their citizens, although in both cases a limited number of foreign visitors have been permitted to obtain amateur licenses in the past decade. Some developing countries, especially those in Africa, Asia, and Latin America, require the payment of annual license fees that can be prohibitively expensive for most of their citizens. A few small countries may not have a national licensing process and may instead require prospective amateur radio operators to take the licensing examinations of a foreign country. In countries with the largest numbers of amateur radio licensees, such as Japan, the United States, Thailand, Canada, and most of the countries in Europe, there are frequent license examinations opportunities in major cities.

Granting a separate license to a club or organization generally requires that an individual with a current and valid amateur radio license who is in good standing with the telecommunications authority assumes responsibility for any operations conducted under the club license or club call sign. A few countries may issue special licenses to novices or beginners that do not assign the individual a call sign but instead require the newly licensed individual to operate from stations licensed to a club or organization for a period of time before a higher class of license can be acquired.

Reciprocal licensing

A reciprocal licensing agreement between two countries allows bearers of an amateur radio license in one country under certain conditions to legally operate an amateur radio station in the other country without having to obtain an amateur radio license from the country being visited, or the bearer of a valid license in one country can receive a separate license and a call sign in another country, both of which have a mutually-agreed reciprocal licensing approvals. Reciprocal licensing requirements vary from country to country. Some countries have bilateral or multilateral reciprocal operating agreements allowing hams to operate within their borders with a single set of requirements. Some countries lack reciprocal licensing systems. Others use international bodies such as the Organization of American States to facilitate licensing reciprocity.

When traveling abroad, visiting amateur operators must follow the rules of the country in which they wish to operate. Some countries have reciprocal international operating agreements allowing hams from other countries to operate within their borders with just their home country license. Other host countries require that the visiting ham apply for a formal permit, or even a new host country-issued license, in advance.

The reciprocal recognition of licenses frequently not only depends on the involved licensing authorities, but also on the nationality of the bearer. As an example, in the US, foreign licenses are recognized only if the bearer does not have US citizenship and holds no US license (which may differ in terms of operating privileges and restrictions). Conversely, a US citizen may operate under reciprocal agreements in Canada, but not a non-US citizen holding a US license.

Newcomers
Many people start their involvement in amateur radio on social media or by finding a local club. Clubs often provide information about licensing, local operating practices, and technical advice. Newcomers also often study independently by purchasing books or other materials, sometimes with the help of a mentor, teacher, or friend. Established amateurs who help newcomers are often referred to as "Elmers", as coined by Rodney Newkirk, W9BRD, within the ham community. In addition, many countries have national amateur radio societies which encourage newcomers and work with government communications regulation authorities for the benefit of all radio amateurs. The oldest of these societies is the Wireless Institute of Australia, formed in 1910; other notable societies are the Radio Society of Great Britain, the American Radio Relay League, Radio Amateurs of Canada, Bangladesh NGOs Network for Radio and Communication, the New Zealand Association of Radio Transmitters and South African Radio League. (See :Category:Amateur radio organizations)

Call signs

An amateur radio operator uses a call sign on the air to legally identify the operator or station.
In some countries, the call sign assigned to the station must always be used, whereas in other countries, the call sign of either the operator or the station may be used.
In certain jurisdictions, an operator may also select a "vanity" call sign although these must also conform to the issuing government's allocation and structure used for Amateur Radio call signs. Some jurisdictions require a fee to obtain such a vanity call sign; in others, such as the UK, a fee is not required and the vanity call sign may be selected when the license is applied for. The FCC in the U.S. discontinued its fee for vanity call sign applications in September 2015.

Call sign structure as prescribed by the ITU consists of three parts which break down as follows, using the call sign ZS1NAT as an example:
 ZS – Shows the country from which the call sign originates and may also indicate the license class. (This call sign is licensed in South Africa.)

 1 – Gives the subdivision of the country or territory indicated in the first part (this one refers to the Western Cape).
 NAT – The final part is unique to the holder of the license, identifying that station specifically.

Many countries do not follow the ITU convention for the numeral. In the United Kingdom the original calls G0xxx, G2xxx, G3xxx, G4xxx, were Full (A) License holders along with the last M0xxx full call signs issued by the City & Guilds examination authority in December 2003. Additional Full Licenses were originally granted to (B) Licensees with G1xxx, G6xxx, G7xxx, G8xxx and 1991 onward with M1xxx call signs. The newer three-level Intermediate License holders are assigned 2E0xxx and 2E1xxx, and the basic Foundation License holders are granted call signs M3xxx, M6xxx or M7xxx.

Instead of using numbers, in the UK the second letter after the initial ‘G’ or 'M' identifies the station's location; for example, a call sign G7OOE becomes GM7OOE and M0RDM becomes MM0RDM when that license holder is operating a station in Scotland. Prefix "GM" & "MM" are Scotland, "GW" & "MW" are Wales, "GI" & "MI" are Northern Ireland, "GD" & "MD" are the Isle of Man, "GJ" & "MJ" are Jersey and "GU" & "MU" are Guernsey. Intermediate licence call signs are slightly different. They begin 2#0 and 2#1 where the # is replaced with the country letters as above. For example "2M0" and "2M1" are Scotland, "2W0" and "2W1" are Wales and so on. The exception however is for England. The letter "E" is used, but only in intermediate-level call signs. For example "2E0" & "2E1" are used whereas the call signs beginning G or M for foundation and full licensees never use the "E".

In the United States, for non-vanity licenses, the numeral indicates the geographical district the holder resided in when the license was first issued. Prior to 1978, US hams were required to obtain a new call sign if they moved out of their geographic district.

In Canada, call signs start with VA, VE, VY, VO, and CY. Call signs starting with 'V' end with a number after to indicate the political region; prefix CY indicates geographic islands. Prefix VA1 or VE1 is Nova Scotia, VA2VE2 is Quebec, VA3VE3 is Ontario, VA4VE4 is Manitoba, VA5VE5 is Saskatchewan, VA6VE6 is Alberta, VA7VE7 is British Columbia, VE8 is the Northwest Territories, VE9 is New Brunswick, VY0 is Nunavut, VY1 is Yukon, VY2 is Prince Edward Island, VO1 is Newfoundland, and VO2 is Labrador. CY is for amateurs operating from Sable Island (CY0) or St. Paul Island (CY9), both of which require Coast Guard permission to access. The last two or three letters of the call signs are typically the operator's choice (upon completing the licensing test, the ham writes three most-preferred options). Two-letter call sign suffixes require a ham to have already been licensed for 5 years. Call signs in Canada can be requested with a fee.

Also, for smaller geopolitical entities, the numeral may be part of the country identification. For example, VP2xxx is in the British West Indies, which is subdivided into VP2Exx Anguilla, VP2Mxx Montserrat, and VP2Vxx British Virgin Islands. VP5xxx is in the Turks and Caicos Islands, VP6xxx is on Pitcairn Island, VP8xxx is in the Falklands, and VP9xxx is in Bermuda.

Online callbooks or call sign databases can be browsed or searched to find out who holds a specific call sign. An example of an online callbook is QRZ.com. Non-exhaustive lists of famous people who hold or have held amateur radio call signs have also been compiled and published.

Many jurisdictions (but not in the UK & Europe) may issue specialty vehicle registration plates to licensed amateur radio operators. The fees for application and renewal are usually less than the standard rate for specialty plates.

Privileges
In most administrations, unlike other RF spectrum users, radio amateurs may build or modify transmitting equipment for their own use within the amateur spectrum without the need to obtain government certification of the equipment. Licensed amateurs can also use any frequency in their bands (rather than being allocated fixed frequencies or channels) and can operate medium to high-powered equipment on a wide range of frequencies so long as they meet certain technical parameters including occupied bandwidth, power, and prevention of spurious emission.

Radio amateurs have access to frequency allocations throughout the RF spectrum, usually allowing choice of an effective frequency for communications across a local, regional, or worldwide path. The shortwave bands, or HF, are suitable for worldwide communication, and the VHF and UHF bands normally provide local or regional communication, while the microwave bands have enough space, or bandwidth, for amateur television transmissions and high-speed computer networks.

In most countries, an amateur radio license grants permission to the license holder to own, modify, and operate equipment that is not certified by a governmental regulatory agency. This encourages amateur radio operators to experiment with home-constructed or modified equipment. The use of such equipment must still satisfy national and international standards on spurious emissions.

Amateur radio operators are encouraged both by regulations and tradition of respectful use of the spectrum to use as little power as possible to accomplish the communication. This is to minimise interference or EMC to any other device. Although allowable power levels are moderate by commercial standards, they are sufficient to enable global communication. Lower license classes usually have lower power limits; for example, the lowest license class in the UK (Foundation licence) has a limit of 10 W.

Power limits vary from country to country and between license classes within a country. For example, the peak envelope power limits for the highest available license classes in a few selected countries are: 2.25 kW in Canada; 1.5 kW in the United States; 1.0 kW in Belgium, Luxembourg, Switzerland, South Africa and New Zealand; 750 W in Germany; 500 W in Italy; 400 W in Australia, India, and the United Kingdom; and 150 W in Oman.

Output power limits may also depend on the mode of transmission. In Australia, for example, 400 W may be used for SSB transmissions, but FM and other modes are limited to 120 W.

The point at which power output is measured may also affect transmissions. The United Kingdom measures at the point the antenna is connected to the signal feed cable, which means the radio system may transmit more than 400 W to overcome signal loss in the cable; conversely, Germany measures power at the output of the final amplification stage, which results in a loss in radiated power with longer cable feeds.

Certain countries permit amateur radio licence holders to hold a Notice of Variation that allows higher power to be used than normally allowed for certain specific purposes. E.g. in the UK some amateur radio licence holders are allowed to transmit using (33 dBw) 2.0 kW for experiments entailing using the moon as a passive radio reflector (known as Earth–Moon–Earth communication) (EME).

Band plans and frequency allocations

The International Telecommunication Union (ITU) governs the allocation of communications frequencies worldwide, with participation by each nation's communications regulation authority. National communications regulators have some liberty to restrict access to these bandplan frequencies or to award additional allocations as long as radio services in other countries do not suffer interference. In some countries, specific emission types are restricted to certain parts of the radio spectrum, and in most other countries, International Amateur Radio Union (IARU) member societies adopt voluntary plans to ensure the most effective use of spectrum.

In a few cases, a national telecommunication agency may also allow hams to use frequencies outside of the internationally allocated amateur radio bands. In Trinidad and Tobago, hams are allowed to use a repeater which is located on 148.800 MHz. This repeater is used and maintained by the National Emergency Management Agency (NEMA), but may be used by radio amateurs in times of emergency or during normal times to test their capability and conduct emergency drills. This repeater can also be used by non-ham NEMA staff and REACT members. In Australia and New Zealand ham operators are authorized to use one of the UHF TV channels. In the U.S., amateur radio operators providing essential communication needs in connection with the immediate safety of human life and immediate protection of property when normal communication systems are not available may use any frequency including those of other radio services such as police and fire and in cases of disaster in Alaska may use the statewide emergency frequency of 5.1675 MHz with restrictions upon emissions.

Similarly, amateurs in the United States may apply to be registered with the Military Auxiliary Radio System (MARS). Once approved and trained, these amateurs also operate on US government military frequencies to provide contingency communications and morale message traffic support to the military services.

Modes of communication

Amateurs use a variety of voice, text, image, and data communications modes over radio. Generally new modes can be tested in the amateur radio service, although national regulations may require disclosure of a new mode to permit radio licensing authorities to monitor the transmissions. Encryption, for example, is not generally permitted in the Amateur Radio service except for the special purpose of satellite vehicle control uplinks. The following is a partial list of the modes of communication used, where the mode includes both modulation types and operating protocols.

Voice
 Amplitude modulation (AM)
 Double Sideband Suppressed Carrier (DSB-SC)
 Independent Sideband (ISB)
 Single Sideband (SSB)
 Amplitude Modulation Equivalent (AME)
 Frequency modulation (FM)
 Phase modulation (PM)

Image
 Amateur Television (ATV), also known as Fast Scan television
 Slow-Scan Television (SSTV)
 Radiofax

Text and data
In former times, most amateur digital modes are transmitted by inserting audio into the microphone input of a radio and using an analog scheme, such as amplitude modulation (AM), frequency modulation (FM), or single-sideband modulation (SSB). Beginning in 2017, increased use of several digital modes, particularly FT8, became popular within the amateur radio community.

Text-modes 
 Continuous Wave (CW), usually used for Morse code
 Automatic Link Establishment (ALE)
 AMateur Teleprinting Over Radio (AMTOR)
 PACTOR
 Radioteletype (RTTY)
 Hellschreiber, also referred to as either Feld-Hell, or Hell

Digimodes 
 D-STAR
 Digital mobile radio
 Fusion (Yaesu own mode)
 GTOR
 Discrete multi-tone modulation modes such as Multi Tone 63 (MT63)
 Multiple Frequency-Shift Keying (MFSK) modes such as
FSK441, JT6M, JT65, JT9, FT8, FT4
JS8Call
WSPR
Olivia MFSK
 Packet radio (AX.25) (not supported anymore)
 Automatic Packet Reporting System (APRS)
 Phase-Shift Keying
 31-baud binary phase shift keying: PSK31
 31-baud quadrature phase shift keying: QPSK31
 63-baud binary phase shift keying: PSK63
 63-baud quadrature phase shift keying: QPSK63
 CLOVER

Modes by activity
The following "modes" use no one specific modulation scheme but rather are classified by the activity of the communication.
 AllStarLink (AllStar / ASL)
 Earth-Moon-Earth (EME)
 EchoLink
 Internet Radio Linking Project (IRLP)
 Low Transmitter Power (QRP)
 Satellite (OSCAR – Orbiting Satellite Carrying Amateur Radio)

See also

 DX Century Club
 Hamfest
 International Amateur Radio Union
 List of amateur radio magazines
 List of amateur radio organizations
 List of amateur radio software
 Maritime mobile amateur radio
 NEC-2 (antenna modeling)
 Prosigns for Morse code
 Piracy in amateur and two-way radio
 70-centimeter band (aka 440 MHz)
 2-meter band
 Microwave
 Worked All Continents
 Worked All Zones
 Summits On The Air
 Parks On The Air

References

General references

Australia
 

Canada
 

India
 

United Kingdom
 

United States

Further reading

External links

 

 
History of radio
Radiocommunication services ITU